Olgiate Olona is a town and comune located in the province of Varese, in the Lombardy region of northern Italy.
The town is bathed by the river Olona.

The town of Olgiate Olona is divided into three "districts": the Center, Gerbone and Buon Gesù. 

Between boundaries of Marnate and Gorla Minore is located a military monument of II World War called Marnate's Bunker.

References

Cities and towns in Lombardy